The 2022 Connacht Senior Football Championship was the 2022 iteration of the Connacht Senior Football Championship organised by Connacht GAA.

London and New York were withdrawn from the 2020 and 2021 Connacht championships as part of the impact of the COVID-19 pandemic on Gaelic games, due to international travel restrictions, but both returned for the 2022 season.

Galway won the competition.

Teams
The 2022 Connacht championship is contested by the five counties in the Irish province of Connacht and the two foreign-based teams of London and New York.

Draw
One team received a bye to the semi-finals. London and New York had home advantage in the quarter-finals.

Bracket

Quarter-finals

Semi-finals

Final

Galway advanced to the 2022 All-Ireland SFC quarter-finals, while Roscommon advanced to the 2022 All-Ireland SFC qualifiers.

All-Ireland/Tailteann Cup qualification
{| class="wikitable" style="text-align:center"
! width="20" |
! width="150" style="text-align:left;" |Team
!Championship
!Qualification Method
|- style="background:#ccffcc"
|2|| align="left" | Mayo
| rowspan="3" |Advance to the 2022 All-Ireland Senior Football Championship
|Via the 2022 National Football League
|- style="background:#ccffcc"
|7|| align="left" | Roscommon
| rowspan="2" |Via Provincial Final
|- style="background:#ccffcc"
|8|| align="left" | Galway
|-
| colspan="4" |
|- style="background:#FFFFE0"
|27|| align="left" | Sligo
| rowspan="4" |Advance to the 2022 Tailteann Cup
| rowspan="4" | Via the 2022 National Football League
|- style="background:#FFFFE0"
|28|| align="left" | Leitrim
|- style="background:#FFFFE0"
|29|| align="left" | London
|- style="background:#FFFFE0"
| -|| align="left" | New York
|}

See also
2022 All-Ireland Senior Football Championship
2022 Leinster Senior Football Championship
2022 Munster Senior Football Championship
2022 Ulster Senior Football Championship

References

2C
Connacht Senior Football Championship